Waitiki Landing is a locality near the northern tip of New Zealand's North Island, in the Far North district of Northland. Located on State Highway 1, it is 20 kilometres from the end of the highway at Cape Reinga. 

It has a general store, petrol/diesel refueling station, cafe, commercial holiday park, electric vehicle charging station and airstrip, all of which are the northernmost in New Zealand. The airstrip is used by Salt Air for excursions from the Bay of Islands to Cape Reinga. The petrol station and general store burnt down on 8 October 2011 and were rebuilt and reopened on 22 December 2011.

A side-road runs eastward from Waitiki Landing to Te Hāpua, the northernmost settlement in New Zealand. Five kilometres north-west on the highway, another side-road leads south-west to Te Paki Sand Dunes, beside Ninety Mile Beach.

Demographics
The SA1 area is part of the larger North Cape statistical area.

The SA1 statistical area had a population of 114 at the 2018 New Zealand census, an increase of 9 people (8.6%) since the 2013 census, and an increase of 21 people (22.6%) since the 2006 census. There were 36 households, comprising 60 males and 54 females, giving a sex ratio of 1.11 males per female. The median age was 36.5 years (compared with 37.4 years nationally), with 30 people (26.3%) aged under 15 years, 21 (18.4%) aged 15 to 29, 48 (42.1%) aged 30 to 64, and 18 (15.8%) aged 65 or older.

Ethnicities were 23.7% European/Pākehā, 81.6% Māori, and 13.2% Pacific peoples People may identify with more than one ethnicity.

Of those people who chose to answer the census's question about religious affiliation, 15.8% had no religion, 44.7% were Christian and 36.8% had Māori religious beliefs.

Of those at least 15 years old, 3 (3.6%) people had a bachelor or higher degree, and 27 (32.1%) people had no formal qualifications. The median income was $24,400, compared with $31,800 nationally. 6 people (7.1%) earned over $70,000 compared to 17.2% nationally. The employment status of those at least 15 was that 36 (42.9%) people were employed full-time, 15 (17.9%) were part-time, and 6 (7.1%) were unemployed.

References

Far North District
Populated places in the Northland Region